In ancient Egypt a shen ring was a circle with a line tangent to it, represented in hieroglyphs as a stylised loop of a rope. The word shen itself means, in ancient Egyptian, encircle, while the shen ring represented eternal protection. 

In Gardiner's sign list, it is sign V9.

Shen ring use in iconography

The shen ring is most often seen carried by the falcon god Horus, but was also carried by the vulture goddess Nekhbet. It was used as early as the Third Dynasty where it can be seen in the reliefs from Djoser's Step Pyramid complex.

The symbol could be stretched to contain other objects, which were then understood as being eternally protected by the shen ring. In its elongated form the shen ring became the cartouche, which enclosed and protected a royal name.

The Goddess Heqet, (the 'Frog'), is often seated on a shenu.

For Eternity, the renpit, papyrus stalk is usually based on top of a Shen ring.  See the Egyptian god Huh.  (Senusret I has a famous Lintel relief showing this.)

The shen ring is often attached to various types of staffs, the staff of authority, or power, symbolizing the Eternal authority of that power.

The Goddess Isis, and the Goddess Nekhbet are often shown kneeling, with their hands resting upon a shenu.

The Hawk (Horus), and the Vulture (Goddess Mut) have the shenu in their talons, wings outstretched, over the scene portrayed. The "Horus with Outstretched Wings", shenus in its talons, is an example from the Louvre of a Pectoral Brooch, possibly for royalty.

Outside of Egypt, a Tartessian archaeological site, Cancho Roano in southern Spain, has a shen ring shaped altar.

See also

Cartouche
Huh (god)
Rod and ring symbol
Two whips with shen ring (hieroglyph)

References 

Egyptian mythology
Egyptian hieroglyphs: rope-fiber-baskets-bags
Ancient Egyptian symbols